, more commonly known as  or , is a semiannual doujinshi convention in Tokyo, Japan. A grassroots market focused on the sale of doujin (self-published) works, Comiket is a not-for-profit fan convention administered by the volunteer-run Comic Market Preparatory Committee (ComiketPC). Inaugurated on 21 December 1975 with an estimated 700 attendees, Comiket has since grown to become the largest fan convention in the world, with an estimated turnstile attendance of 750,000 in 2019.

Programme

Dōjin marketplace
Comiket is focused primarily on the sale of dōjin: non-commercial, self-published works. Approximately 35,000 circles (a term for groups or individuals who create dōjin) participate in each edition of Comiket. Different circles exhibit on each day of Comiket; circles producing works on a common subject, such as a particular media franchise or manga genre, are typically grouped on the same day. The most common item sold at Comiket is dōjinshi (self-published comics, novels or magazines), while a smaller number of circles sell dōjin soft, analog (board/card/etc.) games, music, clothing, and other goods. These are often derivative fan works based on anime, video games, and other media, legal according to Japanese law (shinkokuzai). Since Comiket's inauguration, sample copies of all works sold at Comiket are collected and archived by ComiketPC, with over 2.1 million works having been archived.

Trends in derivative works

Cosplay

Comiket is a major outlet for cosplay enthusiasts. Since Comiket 80 in 2011, restrictions on cosplaying have been gradually relaxed, with a shift from regulating objects (e.g. a ban on items that could be used as weapons) to regulating behavior (e.g. a ban on swinging around long objects). Some general contemporary guidelines include not wearing clothes that are too revealing, not imitating uniformed officers, and being out of cosplay when arriving/departing from Comiket.

Corporate booths
Comiket hosts 190 corporate booths each year. This includes both large commercial companies, such as video game studios and manga publishers, as well as celebrity meet and greet sessions.

Operations

Schedule

Comiket is held twice yearly, in August and December. These events are distinguished as "Summer Comic Market" (Natsukomi) and "Winter Comic Market" (Fuyukomi). Since 1995, both events have run for three days each, with Summer Comiket generally occurring Friday to Sunday in mid-August, and Winter Comiket generally occurring the three days prior to New Year's Day. Starting with Comiket 96, the events have been four days long. Both events run daily from 10:00a.m. to 4:00p.m, with corporate booths open until 5:00p.m and the entire convention closing an hour early on the final day of the event. Comiket has been held at Tokyo Big Sight in Ariake, Tokyo since 1996. Comiket 98, which was planned for August 2020, was the event's first cancellation in its history as a result of the COVID-19 pandemic; Comiket 99, which would have been held in December 2020 was instead held in December 2021, two years after the last time it was held, and ran for only two days.

Event size

Comiket is the largest fan convention in the world, growing from fewer than 10,000 attendees in 1982 to over half a million by 2004. Since 2007, attendee numbers have fluctuated in the region of 500,000 for Winter Comiket and 560,000 for Summer Comiket. Because of the extremely high volume of attendance at Comiket, mobile phone companies set up temporary antennas, while the Tokyo Metro makes special arrangements to accommodate the large crowds. Hour-long queues to enter Comiket during peak hours are common, while some attendees queue up to five hours before the event to ensure early admission. Popular circles are frequently placed near the venue's loading docks so that their queues can extend outside. ComiketPC recommends that first-time attendees arrive in the afternoon to avoid queues.

Catalog
For every Comiket, a catalog is released that contains information about the event. The catalog includes a list of all participating circles, maps of the convention layout, directions to and from the convention, rules for the convention, results from surveys held among Comiket participants, articles about topics relevant to dōjinshi creators, and one to two pictures ("circle cuts") for every participating circle. It is available in print and DVD-ROM format, and since Comiket 83, is available online behind a partial paywall.

Catalogs are made available for sale at stores two weeks before the event. The print version is roughly the size of an average phone book, while the DVD-ROM version includes features such as advanced search functions and a clickable map. To date, there is no English edition of the catalog available, though the catalog does contain a four-page basic guide for attending Comiket in English, Chinese, and Korean.

Prior to Comiket 96, a purchased catalog was not required for admission to Comiket (see 2020 Summer Olympics changes below).

Participants

The overwhelming majority of Comiket circle participants are amateur and hobbyist artists: 70% of participating circles lose money, while only 15% turn a profit. The majority of circle participants at Comiket are female, with women composing 57% of participating circles at Comiket 84. General attendees at Comiket tend to skew male, with men comprising 64% of attendees at Comiket 78.

Of the Comiket circle participants, a 2011 poll showed that nearly half participated because attending the event and showing off their work is enjoyable, and a significant percentage came to spread their works to the public. A smaller percentage of dōjinshi creators' goal is to promote an idea or opinion through attending Comiket.

The majority of those participating in circles in 2010 said that they are a part of a one-person circle (59%), while two-person (20%) and three person (8%) circles were also common.

Philanthropy
Since 1993, ComiketPC has donated over ¥60 million to sustainable forest management to offset paper used in the production of dōjinshi. Since 2007, ComiketPC has worked with the Japanese Red Cross Society to organize bloodmobiles at Comiket events, with donors given Comiket-exclusive posters depicting characters from anime and video games. The Red Cross receives an estimated 1,500 blood donations at each Comiket.

History

The first Comiket was organized amid a period of immense change and upheaval for manga as a medium, characterized by the closure of the experimental manga magazine COM and the ascendance of the Year 24 Group. A 1975 incident in which a dōjin creator applying for Nihon SF Taikai was refused admission after criticizing the convention's focus on professional guests over dōjin creators in her application became a catalyst for the founding of Comiket as a fan convention.

As Comiket grew, a lottery system to allocate exhibition space was implemented in 1979, as the number of applications from circles began to surpass available space. Comiket would change locations frequently throughout the late 1980s and 1990s, as the Japanese bubble economy led to an upsurge in trade shows that made it difficult to secure a consistent venue. The murders by Tsutomu Miyazaki and subsequent moral panic against otaku would lead to further difficulties in Comiket's ability to secure a venue. Tokyo Big Sight hosted Comiket for the first time in 1996, and remains the convention's primary venue.

In 2012, anonymous threats made against circles creating works related to Kuroko's Basketball led Comiket to prohibit the sale of all Kuroko's Basketball-related items at Comiket 85 (see Kuroko's Basketball § Controversies). Organizers refunded the registration fees for the roughly 900 circles producing Kuroko's Basketball items, resulting in a loss for Comiket of roughly ¥10 million. In 2015, ComiketPC organized a special event specifically focused on doujinshi related to the series. Affectionately nicknamed "Kuroket", the event hosted approximately 2,400 circles producing Kuroko's Basketball items.

In August 2018, ComiketPC announced modified schedules for Comikets 96, 97, and 98 due to the 2020 Summer Olympics. As the east wing of Big Sight closed in 2019 for renovations in advance of the Olympics, the corporate booths of C96 and C97 were moved to Aomi Exhibition Hall, and both events expanded to four days of programming. Admission to both events required the purchase of a wristband – the first time in Comiket's history it was not free to attend – in order to offset the cost of running the event across four days, and to depress attendance in light of the smaller venue space. Wristbands for all four days were included with the purchase of a print event catalog, while individual wristbands for each day were available to purchase at Big Sight the day of the event. C98 in 2020 was slated to be moved to Golden Week in May in order to not conflict with the Olympics in August. On 27 March 2020, ComiketPC announced that C98 had been cancelled due to the COVID-19 pandemic, making it the first time a Comiket event has been cancelled. On 12 July 2020, it was announced that Comiket 99 would be postponed to 2021, taking place during Golden Week as C98 would have in order to not conflict with the Summer Olympics, which were also postponed. A virtual event titled "Air Comiket" was held in December to replace its originally planned dates. Comic Market 99 was ultimately delayed to December 2021, and ran for only two days with entry limited to 55,000 people per day by requiring ticket purchases.

Event history

See also
 Lucca Comics & Games, the largest comics festival in Europe, and the second biggest in the world after the Comiket
 Comic World, an anime and doujin festival with events in South Korea, Hong Kong, and Taiwan
 Comifuro, a doujin convention in Indonesia.
 Anime Expo, an anime convention in the United States
 Japan Expo, a Japanese pop culture convention in France
 Overload, a doujin festival in New Zealand

Notes

References

Further reading
 "What is Comic Market?", a presentation by the Comic Market Preparatory Committee, February 2008
 "The Japan Comic Market FAQ: A Gaijin's Guide to Comike", a guide for tourists attending Comiket, August 2004 (via Archive)
 "How to Comiket, Part I: Intelligence" and "Part II: Strategy", a guide for tourists attending Comiket, July 2005 (via Archive)
 "Ticktank's English Guide to Comiket", a guide for tourists attending Comiket, August 2008
 "The Road to Comiket", a guide for foreign creators applying for Comiket, December 2007 (via Archive)
 "The Fragile Heart of Moé", an 8-minute clip from a feature-length documentary about dojinshi and Comiket, 2010

External links

 Official Comic Market website (in Japanese)
 Official Comic Market website (in English)

Anime conventions in Japan
Book fairs in Japan
Comics conventions
Doujin
Otaku
Recurring events established in 1975